"Like Only a Woman Can" is a song written by Irish singer Brian McFadden and Phil Thornalley. It was first released as a single in Ireland only, where it reached the number-one position in April 2007. In March 2008, an alternative version of the song was released in Australia and New Zealand as the lead single from McFadden's second studio album, Set in Stone (2008), peaking at numbers 13 and 39, respectively. The video for the song was shot in Brisbane, Australia.

Lyrical content
McFadden explained in an interview that "Like Only a Woman Can" is "an open and frank love-song to someone who has helped the writer find redemption." He went on to explain, "It's a song about Delta. Equally, it's me admitting the mistakes of my past, while looking forward to the future."

Track listings
 Irish CD single
 "Like Only a Woman Can" (original mix) – 3:38
 "Like Only a Woman Can" (acoustic) – 3:24 
 "Mud in Your Eye"  – 3:11

 Australian CD single
 "Like Only a Woman Can" (Australian version) – 3:51
 "Inside Out"  – 3:56

 Australian digital download
 "Like Only a Woman Can" (Australian version) – 3:51
 "Inside Out" – 3:56 
 "Like Only a Woman Can" (stereo radio mix) – 3:48

Charts

Weekly charts

Year-end charts

Certifications

References

2007 songs
2007 singles
2008 singles
Brian McFadden songs
Irish Singles Chart number-one singles
Songs written by Brian McFadden
Songs written by Phil Thornalley